The Albanian Weightlifting Federation (FSHP) is a permanent non-profit organization founded in 1949 in Tirana, Albania.

As a member of the National Olympic Committee of Albania and one of the oldest sports federations in the country, it has the legal authority to organize national and international competitions for the sport of weightlifting.

The federation was admitted as a member of the European Weightlifting Federation (EWF) and the International Weightlifting Federation (IWF).

Medals 

 European Weightlifting Championships

 World Weightlifting Championships

 Weightlifting at the Mediterranean Games

See also  
 Sports in Albania
 Albanian Records in Olympic Weightlifting
 Albanian Olympic Committee
 Albania at the Olympics
 Albania at the Mediterranean Games

References

External links
 

Weightlifting
Sports organizations established in 1949